Parthasarathy Ranganathan is currently at Google designing their next-generation systems, and prior to that was at the Hewlett Packard Labs, Palo Alto, CA.  He was named Fellow of the Institute of Electrical and Electronics Engineers (IEEE) in 2012 for contributions to energy-efficient datacenters.  Dr. Ranganathan received his B.Tech degree from the Indian Institute of Technology, Madras and his M.S. and Ph.D. from Rice University.

References 

Fellow Members of the IEEE
Rice University alumni
Living people
Year of birth missing (living people)
American electrical engineers